Alice Gasparini (born 14 December 1997) is an Italian professional racing cyclist, who currently rides for UCI Women's Continental Team .

See also
 List of 2016 UCI Women's Teams and riders

References

External links
 

1997 births
Living people
Italian female cyclists
Place of birth missing (living people)
Sportspeople from Como
Cyclists from the Province of Como